Don't Let's Go to the Dogs Tonight, a memoir of life with Alexandra Fuller and her family on a farm in Rhodesia (now Zimbabwe.)  After the Rhodesian Bush War ended in 1980, the Fullers moved to Malawi, and then to Zambia. Don't Let's Go to the Dogs Tonight won the Winifred Holtby Memorial Prize in 2002, was a New York Times Notable Book for 2002 and a finalist for The Guardians First Book Award, an award given to the best regional novel of the year.

Plot summary
Alexandra Fuller's book tells the story of her family of white Zimbabwean tenant farmers in the years before and after Independence. These are not the wealthy landowners demonised by the present Zimbabwean government; they struggle to make a living off the land, as well as the usual hazards of the African bush, they fear landmines and attacks by guerrillas crossing the border from Mozambique. During the civil war, their parents join the police reserve. Bobo and her sister are warned not to come into their parents' bedroom in the night because they sleep with loaded guns. Then at Independence (1980), Bobo and her classmates are stunned to see black pupils far wealthier and more sophisticated than them joining their elite high school. Their farm is seized by the new government and awarded to political cronies under a land distribution programme and they move south to a much harsher ranch, where their diet is based on impala and brackish water from a borehole that is strictly rationed.

From Zimbabwe, the Fullers move to Malawi, where they are closely watched by government agents, notably a houseboy who presents himself for employment and will not take 'no' for an answer. When Bobo's father jokingly describes his newly built beach hut on the shore of Lake Malawi as 'a palace', the houseboy makes his report and the carload of presidential officials who rush down to inspect it are furious to find a hut made of mud, poles and thatch. When the family moves on to Zambia, they have lived in every country in the former Federation of Rhodesia and Nyasaland. With the resilience of childhood, Bobo takes extraordinary events in her stride. The politics and the everyday struggle to make a living from the land are mixed with family tragedy; a sister drowned, a brother dead from meningitis and another stillborn. The family handle their mother's alcoholism and insanity with the same stoicism they handle any other misfortune, though they do occasionally compare themselves to families with normal mothers, clean swimming pools, home baking and children free of worms. The title is taken from a line by the writer and humorist AP Herbert, 'Don't let's go to the dogs tonight, for mother will be there'.

Awards
2002 Winifred Holtby Memorial Prize, 2002 Booksense best non-fiction book, 2004 Ulysses Prize for Art of Reportage

Memoirs
Books about Rhodesia
Books about Zimbabwe
Refugee memoirs
Childhood in Africa